Pavlovsky Uyezd was an uyezd of Voronezh Governorate in the Russian Empire. It was situated in the central part of the governorate. Its administrative centre was Pavlovsk.

History 
The uyezd was established in 1779 when Voronezh Governorship, which became Voronezh Governorate in 1796, was created. It was abolished on 12 May 1924 and its territory divided between Bobrovsky and Bogucharsky uyezds.

Demographics 
At the time of the Russian Empire Census of 1897, Pavlovsky Uyezd had a population of 157,365. Of these, 57.8% spoke Russian, 42.0% Ukrainian, 0.1% Belarusian and 0.1% Yiddish as their native language.

References 

Voronezh Governorate
Uezds of Voronezh Governorate